Didier Eribon (born 10 July 1953) is a French author and philosopher, and a historian of French intellectual life. He lives in Paris.

Life 
Didier Eribon was born in Reims into a working-class family. He was the first in his family to finish  secondary education and abandon his working-class identity. He credits his mother with helping him achieve this; a factory worker, she had to work overtime to be able to pay for his education. Working as a hotel porter at night and going to college during day, abandoning his parents' ways of life, Eribon felt like a working-class "traitor". He never became part of the rich elite, whose children even in education have different routes, the grandes écoles for the elite. The non-elite attend the universities.

Work 
Didier Eribon is professor at the School of Philosophy and Social Sciences of the University of Amiens (France). He has for years been running a seminar at the École des hautes études en sciences sociales in Paris. He has also been Visiting Professor at the University of California, Berkeley for several years, and at the Institute for Advanced Study, Princeton.

Eribon has lectured in a great number of countries and, in the U.S., at The New School, University of Chicago, Harvard University, Yale University, New York University (NYU), the University of Michigan at Ann Arbor, the University of Virginia at Charlottesville, Columbia University among others. He was one of the speakers at the Conference "Foucault in Berkeley. Twenty Years Later", held in Berkeley October 2004, with Leo Bersani, Judith Butler, Paul Rabinow, Hubert Dreyfus, Michael Lucey, and others.

He is the author of several books, including his Réflexions sur la question gay (1999, Insult and the Making of the Gay Self), Une morale du minoritaire (2001), and Echapper à la psychanalyse (2005, Escaping Psychoanalysis). His biography of Michel Foucault (1989), published in English in 1991, has been praised by Pierre Bourdieu, Paul Veyne, Paul Rabinow and Hayden White, among others. His 1988 book of conversations with Claude Lévi-Strauss was also published in English in 1991.

Eribon wrote frequently for Le Nouvel Observateur, the French weekly magazine. He reviewed books in the fields of philosophy and social sciences.

Autobiography
His 2009 memoir Returning to Reims has had an influence beyond the field of sociology. French novelist, Édouard Louis cites the book as having "marked a turning point for his future as a writer."

Additionally, the book was adapted for the stage by Laurent Hatat, in a play that debuted at the Festival Avignon in July 2014. It was directed by Thomas Ostermeier as part of the 2017 Manchester International Festival. The book also received enthusiastic reviews in the French press, such as Le Monde, Libération, L'Express and Les Inrockuptibles.

Prizes
Eribon is the recipient of the 2008 Brudner Prize. He returned the prize in May 2011 (see his letter: "I Return the Brudner Prize" on his personal homepage).

Publications 
Michel Foucault. Trans. Betsy Wing. Cambridge, MA: Harvard UP, 1991.
Conversations with Claude Lévi-Strauss, by Claude Lévi-Strauss and Didier Eribon, Translated by Paula Wissing. Chicago: University of Chicago Press, 1991. 192 pages.
  Faut-il brûler Dumézil? Mythologie, science et politique. Paris: Flammarion, 1992
Michel Foucault et ses contemporains (1994).
Insult and the Making of the Gay Self. (originally Réflexions sur la question gay (1999)) Translated by Michael Lucey. Duke University Press, 2004. 440 pages.
Papiers d'identité (2000).
Une morale du minoritaire. Variations sur un thème de Jean Genet (2001)
Hérésies. Essais sur la théorie de la sexualité (2003)
Sur cet instant fragile... Carnets, janvier-août 2004 (2004).
Echapper à la psychanalyse (2005).
D'une revolution conservatrice et de ses effets sur la gauche francaise (2007).
Returning to Reims (2018), an English translation of the Retour à Reims (2009).

Notes and references

External links 
  
 at Columbia Maison Française

1953 births
Writers from Reims
20th-century French philosophers
21st-century French philosophers
University of California, Berkeley faculty
Academic staff of the School for Advanced Studies in the Social Sciences
French gay writers
French LGBT rights activists
French essayists
French sociologists
Living people
Officiers of the Ordre des Arts et des Lettres
21st-century LGBT people